Qarin II, was the ruler of the Bavand dynasty from 1057 to 1074. He was the son of a certain Surkhab, who was possibly the son of the Bavandid ruler Shahriyar III. Not much more is known about Qarin II; he died in 1074, and was succeeded by his son Shahriyar IV.

Sources 
 

Bavand dynasty
11th-century monarchs in Asia
11th-century Iranian people
1074 deaths
Year of birth missing